"Time on Our Hands" is an episode of the BBC sitcom Only Fools and Horses. First screened on 29 December 1996, it was the final episode of that year's Christmas trilogy and the fifteenth Christmas special overall. It attracted a television audience of 24.3 million, a record for a British sitcom. In the episode, the Trotters finally become millionaires. It had initially been intended to be the series finale, but creator John Sullivan wrote three more specials that were screened annually between 2001 and 2003, starting with "If They Could See Us Now".

Synopsis

A nervous Raquel plans the visit of her parents, James and Audrey, for dinner at the flat, and worries about them meeting Del Boy for the first time. Del and Albert reassure her that they will help out. Del is still worried about Rodney after he and Cassandra had suffered a miscarriage two weeks previously, and Albert suggests that they come up with a "counter-worry" to take his mind off it, which leads to Del pretending to be ill, though Rodney barely notices.

Later that day, Rodney is cataloguing stock in the Trotters' garage. Rodney wishes that something good would turn up in their lives. Del says that life is not like that. He picks out an old pocket watch to illustrate his point that their lives will not suddenly get better, out of the blue. Del tosses the watch onto a gas cooker.

Del and Rodney return to their block of flats but the lift breaks down. After being trapped in there for some time, the two brothers have a discussion about Rodney and Cassandra's miscarriage. A distraught Rodney confesses that he has spent too much time feeling sorry for himself since Cassandra lost their baby. Del comforts Rodney by telling him that it is just "a dropped stitch in life's tapestry", which he claims their late mother Joan used to say whenever things went wrong, and assures him that things will get better. Rodney agrees and is finally at peace with the situation, and Del suggests that Rodney goes home and has a heart-to-heart with Cassandra. Once the conversation is over, Del successfully fixes the lift himself, and gets it working again. Only then does Rodney realise that Del had in fact tampered with the controls, in order to force Rodney to talk. The Trotter brothers share a hearty laugh.

That evening, James and Audrey Turner, Raquel's parents, arrive for the meal, and all appears to be going well. However, whilst moving the coffee that Albert has prepared in the kitchen, Del discovers that it is actually gravy, and thus the "gravy" that the guests are pouring on their dinners is in fact coffee. The dinner ruined, all around the table politely mention that they are full up (apart from young Damien who exclaims, "this is horrible!"). When picking up his car from the Trotters' garage the following day, antiques dealer James spots the old pocket watch. It is engraved "Harrison". After closer examination, he suggests that it may be the work of John Harrison, the man who designed and built the world's first successful maritime clock in the 18th century.

The watch is examined by experts, and all accept it to be the Harrison "lesser watch", a semi-mythical piece for which designs exist but there is no clear evidence the watch was ever made. It goes to auction at Sotheby's and after hearing the opening bid of £150,000 (a full £110,000 higher than Del's highest estimate), Del promptly faints. After recovering, he and Rodney rush back into the auction room, with the bidding still going on. The latest bid is revealed to be £3,250,000; it then goes up to £3,500,000 (which Del thinks is £350,000). It then rises to £4,000,000 and Rodney, too, faints. It emerges that the final bid was £6,200,000 (around £3,100,000 each). "We've had worse days", states Del, when Rodney rereads the Sotheby's statement in the Reliant van, and the two brothers begin whooping hysterically, rocking the van with their overjoyed lunacy as their dreams of being millionaires finally comes true.

Del and Rodney visit Boycie's car showroom and, unaware of their new fortune, he teases them about having their photograph taken next to one of his new Rolls-Royces. Wanting to pay his older brother back for helping him throughout his life (including getting over Cassandra's miscarriage), Rodney pays £70,000 for the car as a gift for Del, stunning Boycie into silence when he shows him proof of their new wealth. Later, the Trotters visit The Nag's Head pub, and receive a round of applause and a standing ovation from all of the regulars.

The final scenes, against a backdrop of the Crosby, Stills, Nash and Young song "Our House", show the Trotters enjoying their new life. Del and Raquel move into a mansion while Rodney and Cassandra buy a luxury apartment on the banks of the River Thames. They buy Uncle Albert an expensive yacht, which he promptly crashes into a bridge on the river.

Del sombrely returns to their now empty flat in Nelson Mandela House, and quietly recalls the memories from the flat over the years, hearing quotes from their mother Joan (from a specially recorded voiceover), their father Reg (from "Thicker Than Water"), and Grandad (from "Big Brother"). Rodney also returns, and Del reveals that he is already beginning to miss the old life as a market trader. Albert returns to the flat to get some of his belongings as well to have one last look, and the three leave, though not before Del has answered a call from Lenny Norris offering them 250 carpet steamers. Del is initially eager, but Rodney reminds his older brother that they are not in the business any longer. Del poignantly tells Lenny that "Trotters Independent Traders has ceased trading."

The three men decide to walk to the local Chinese restaurant for a meal. As they set off, Del states that rather than the end for them, it is only just the beginning as they should now invest their new money in the futures market (making one last claim that this was one of the many things his mother Joan said, on her deathbed). The three continue to playfully argue about this as they walk off into an animated sunrise, as Del proclaims that it is their "big chance", and ending with the closing refrain: "This time next year, we could be billionaires!".

Viewing figures
This was initially billed as the series finale of Only Fools and Horses and was watched by 24.3 million viewers, nearly half the population of the country at the time and the highest recorded viewing figure for a comedy in the United Kingdom.

Episode cast

Music
 Boyzone: "Together"
 Crosby, Stills, Nash & Young: "Our House"
 Vince Hill: "Take Me to Your Heart Again"
 Showaddywaddy: "Under the Moon of Love"
 Showaddywaddy: "I Wonder Why"

Note: In the VHS and DVD versions, the track "Our House" is replaced by a cover version by Helen Reddy.

References

External links

1996 British television episodes
British Christmas television episodes
Only Fools and Horses special episodes